Jack Metcalf (born 25 December 1991) is a former English professional footballer.

Career

College and amateur
Metcalf played with Liverpool and Wolves at youth level, before playing as an amateur while studying at Clemson University in the USA between 2010 and 2013.

Professional career
After trialling with several clubs in England, Metcalf signed with United Soccer League club Charlotte Independence in February 2015. In January 2017, Metcalf signed for Welsh club Bangor City. Following the 2022 season, Metcalf retired from playing professional football.

References

External links
Bangor City Bio

1991 births
Living people
English footballers
English expatriate footballers
Clemson Tigers men's soccer players
SC United Bantams players
Charlotte Independence players
Bangor City F.C. players
Atlanta United 2 players
San Diego Loyal SC players
Association football midfielders
Expatriate soccer players in the United States
USL League Two players
USL Championship players
Footballers from Liverpool
English expatriate sportspeople in the United States